Edina Müller (born 28 June 1983) is a German 2.5 point wheelchair basketball player and KL1 canoeist.  She played for ASV Bonn in the German wheelchair basketball league, and for the national team. As part of the  German women's national wheelchair basketball team, she won bronze at the 2006 World Cup in Amsterdam, won three time European champions (in 2007, 2009, 2011), a silver medal at the 2008 Summer Paralympics in Beijing, and a gold medal at the 2012 Summer Paralympics in London.  The team was voted 2008 Team of the Year in disabled sports, and Horst Köhler presented it with Germany's highest sports award, the Silbernes Lorbeerblatt (Silver Laurel Leaf).  President Joachim Gauck awarded the team a second Silver Leaf after it won the gold medal at the 2012 Summer Paralympics. Müller was also a two-time U.S. champion (2006-2008) with her college team Illinois Fighting Illini at the University of Illinois at Urbana-Champaign, and helped ASV Bonn win the European Cup (Willi Brinkmann Cup) in Valladolid, Spain in 2009. From 2011 to 2014 she played for Hamburger SV.

Müller retired from wheelchair basketball after the 2014 Women's World Wheelchair Basketball Championship in Toronto, at which she won silver, and took up canoeing. On 24 May 2015, she won silver in the women's KL1 200 m race at the 2015 ICF Canoe Sprint World Cup in Duisburg. On 19 May 2016, she won gold in the event at the 2016 ICF Canoe Sprint World Cup in Duisburg.

Biography
Edina Müller was born on 28 June 1983,  and raised in the Rhineland town of Brühl. In 2000, at the age of 16, she was playing volleyball, and felt pain in her back. A doctor straightened her back, but within two hours she lost feeling in her legs. She was rushed to hospital where a blood clot was discovered. Diagnosed with paraplegia, she spent the next four months in hospital. She had to repeat Year 10 at Max Ernst Gymnasium, but graduated in 2003. Although she began using a wheelchair, she longed to return to playing sport, and initially tried sitting volleyball. She then took up wheelchair tennis, winning the Hungarian Open in 2005, but ultimately switched to wheelchair basketball, playing for ASV Bonn. In 2005, she was invited to attend a German national team training camp  by its coach, Holger Glinicki. The following year she made the national team and won bronze at the World Championships in Amsterdam.

Müller's mentor and professor at the University of Cologne, Professor Dr Horst Strohkendl, advised her to pursue her sporting career in the United States. She attended a one-week basketball camp in Illinois in 2006, where she was noticed by Michael Frogley, the coach of the Canadian men's national wheelchair basketball team and the Illinois Fighting Illini college team at the University of Illinois at Urbana-Champaign. In both years they won the National Championship with the team.  During the semester break, she travelled with the German women's national team for tournaments and preparation camps.  In 2007, the German women became European champions before a home crowd at Wetzlar.

Müller graduated from the University of Illinois in 2008 with a Bachelor of Science degree in kinesiology, and moved back to Germany, where she helped ASV Bonn win the European Cup (Willi Brinkmann Cup) in Valladolid, Spain in 2009. In 2011, she started playing for Hamburger SV. Her American degree was accepted in Germany, and she qualified as a rehabilitation therapist at BG Trauma Hospital in Hamburg-Boberg. She worked with paraplegic patients, helping them become wheelchair mobile, by strengthening the chest and upper arm muscles. "It makes a difference," she says "that the therapist also cannot walk."

In September 2008, Müller participated in the 2008 Summer Paralympics in Beijing, but Germany was beaten in the gold medal game by the team the United States, which contained a number of former teammates and opponents from the University of Illinois. The German team took home Paralympic silver medals instead. After the Paralympics, the team's performance was considered impressive enough for it to be named the national "Team of the Year", and it received the Silver Laurel Leaf, Germany's highest sporting honour, from German President Horst Koehler. Brühl honoured her with an entry in its Golden Book.

Müller helped the national team defend their European Championship title with the national team in Stoke Mandeville, England in 2009. They hoped for a rematch against the United States at the 2012 Summer Paralympic Games in London, but instead faced the team that had beaten the Americans, the Australia women's national wheelchair basketball team, which included former Illinois teammates Shelley Chaplin and Bridie Kean. They defeated the Australians in front of a crowd of over 12,000 to win the gold medal, They were awarded another Silver Laurel Leaf by President Joachim Gauck in November 2012, and were again named Team of the Year for 2012.

Müller retired from wheelchair basketball after the 2014 Women's World Wheelchair Basketball Championship in Toronto, at which she won silver. She then took up canoeing, training at the Hamburg Canoe Club. "From basketball", she said "I learned to always have the sight set for a big goal. If something doesn’t turn out how it should, it’s not the end of the world. But it always helps to have a goal set in front of you." According to her coach, Jens Kröger,  "It’s easy to motivate her. She’s fighting to reach a training target. She never gives up.” Her hard work paid off. Not only did she earn national team selection, but on 24 May 2105 she won silver in the women's KL1 200 m race at the 2015 ICF Canoe Sprint World Cup in Duisburg in a personal best time of 59.981 seconds, her first time below the one-minute mark. On 19 May 2016 at the 2016 ICF Canoe Sprint World Cup in Duisburg, she went one better, winning gold despite capsizing her canoe that morning during warm up.

Achievements
2006: Bronze World Championship (Amsterdam, Netherlands)
2007: Gold National Championship (Warm Springs, United States)
2007: Gold European Championship (Wetzlar, Germany)
2008: Gold National Championship (Champaign, United States)
2008: Silver Paralympics (Beijing, China)
2009: Gold European Championship (Stoke Mandeville, Great Britain)
2010: Silver World Championships (Birmingham, Great Britain) 
2011: Gold European Championships (Nazareth, Israel)
2012: Gold Paralympic Games (London, England)
2013: Silver European Championships (Frankfurt, Germany)
2014: Silver at the World Championships (Toronto, Canada)
2015: Silver at the ICF Canoe Sprint World Cup (Duisburg, Germany)
2016: Gold at the ICF Canoe Sprint World Cup (Duisburg, Germany)

Awards
2008: Team of the Year
2008: Silver Laurel Leaf
2009: Entry in the Golden Book of the city of Brühl
2012: Team of the Year
2012: Silver Laurel Leaf
2013: Hamburg Sportswoman of the Year

Notes

External links
 
 

1983 births
Living people
German women's wheelchair basketball players
German female canoeists
Paralympic wheelchair basketball players of Germany
Paracanoeists of Germany
Paralympic medalists in wheelchair basketball
Paralympic medalists in paracanoe
Paralympic gold medalists for Germany
Paralympic silver medalists for Germany
Wheelchair basketball players at the 2008 Summer Paralympics
Wheelchair basketball players at the 2012 Summer Paralympics
Paracanoeists at the 2016 Summer Paralympics
Paracanoeists at the 2020 Summer Paralympics
Medalists at the 2008 Summer Paralympics
Medalists at the 2012 Summer Paralympics
Medalists at the 2016 Summer Paralympics
Medalists at the 2020 Summer Paralympics
ICF Canoe Sprint World Championships medalists in paracanoe
Recipients of the Silver Laurel Leaf
Illinois Fighting Illini Paralympic athletes
People from Brühl (Rhineland)
Sportspeople from Cologne (region)